The Thirty-fifth Oklahoma Legislature was a meeting of the legislative branch of the government of Oklahoma, composed of the Senate and the House of Representatives. It met in Oklahoma City from January 7, 1975, to January 4, 1977, during the governorship of David L. Boren.

Lieutenant Governor George Nigh served as President of the Senate, giving him a tie-breaking vote and the authority to serve as a presiding officer. Gene C. Howard served as President pro tempore of the Oklahoma Senate and William Willis served as Speaker of the Oklahoma House of Representatives.

Dates of sessions
First regular session: January 7-June 6, 1975
Second regular session: January 6-June 9, 1976
Special session: July 19–23, 1976
Previous: 34th Legislature • Next: 36th Legislature

Party composition

Senate

House of Representatives

Leadership

Democratic leadership
President Pro Tempore: Gene C. Howard
Speaker: William Willis
Speaker Pro Tempore: Spencer Bernard
Majority Floor Leader: James Townsend

Republican leadership
Minority leader of the Senate: 
Minority leader of the House: Charles Ford

Members

Senate

Table based on 2005 state almanac.

House of Representatives

Membership data based on database of historic members.

References

External links
Oklahoma Senate
Oklahoma House of Representatives

Oklahoma legislative sessions
1975 in Oklahoma
1976 in Oklahoma
1975 U.S. legislative sessions
1976 U.S. legislative sessions